Kailo is a territory in Maniema province of the Democratic Republic of the Congo. Kailo Territory is home to open pit wolframite and Cassiterite mines.

References

Territories of Maniema Province